Hugh Richardson may refer to:
 Hugh Richardson (shipowner) (1784–1870), Canadian businessman and first harbourmaster of Toronto
 Hugh Richardson (magistrate) (1826–1913), Canadian magistrate who sentenced Louis Riel to hang
 Hugh Edward Richardson (1905–2000), British diplomat and Tibetologist